Hercules Christiaan van Heerden, commonly known as Harry van Heerden (Schaapskraal, Tarkastad, Cape Colony, 2 September 1862 – Schaapskraal, Tarkastad, 17 July 1933), South African farmer and politician.

Van Heerden was president of the Senate of the Union of South Africa from 1920 to 1929.

1862 births
1933 deaths
Afrikaner people
South African people of Dutch descent
Presidents of the Senate of South Africa